Rejchartice is a municipality and village in Šumperk District in the Olomouc Region of the Czech Republic. It has about 200 inhabitants.

Etymology
The village was named after its probable founder named Richard.

Geography
It lies in the Hanušovice Highlands. The Rejchartický Creek flows through the municipality.

History
The first written mention of Rejchartice is in a deed of Olomouc bishop Jan Volek from 1350. For centuries, until 1848, the village was part of the Bludov estate and shared its owners.

Sights
The landmark of Rejchartice si the Church of Saints Michael and Gabriel. It was built in the Baroque style in 1768–1770, when the old small church from 1643 was completely rebuilt.

References

External links

Villages in Šumperk District